Manuel Angel Tejada Medina (born 12 January 1989 in Lima) is a Peruvian footballer who plays for Atlético Grau, as a forward .

Club career
Manuel Tejada came from Sporting Cristal's youth divisions. He was promoted to the First Team squad for the start of the 2008 season. On 20 February 2008, manager Juan Carlos Oblitas gave Tejada his Torneo Descentralizado debut with Sporting Cristal by entering in 67th minute in the 1–0 win away to Universidad Cesar Vallejo.

In 2009, he transferred to C.D. Universidad César Vallejo.

Honours

Club
Universidad San Martín
 Peruvian Primera División: 2010

References

External links 

1989 births
Living people
Footballers from Lima
Association football forwards
Peruvian footballers
Sporting Cristal footballers
Club Deportivo Universidad César Vallejo footballers
Club Deportivo Universidad de San Martín de Porres players
Sport Boys footballers
José Gálvez FBC footballers
Cienciano footballers
Universidad Técnica de Cajamarca footballers
Deportivo Coopsol players